Host Monitoring Protocol (HMP) is an obsolete TCP/IP protocol described in RFC 869.

Internet protocols